The  was an infantry division of the Imperial Japanese Army. Its call sign was the .The division was formed on 15 June 1944 in Visayas. The nucleus of the formation was the 31st Independent Mixed Brigade. The 102nd division was a Type C(hei) security division, therefore the division backbone comprised independent infantry battalions instead of infantry regiments.

Action
On 29 July 1944, parts of the division perished when the Yoshino Maru transport was sunk by a US submarine. The rest  of the 102nd division was assembled in Ormoc on 26 October 1944, as the Battle of Leyte has begun since 17 October 1944.

In the course of the Battle of Leyte and subsequent Battle of the Visayas since March 1945, the garrisons of the 102nd division were isolated and increasingly decimated by the US forces. Some sub-units have managed to hold on in mountains until the surrender of Japan 15 August 1945 though.

In particular, during the Invasion of Palawan in March–April 1945, the two battalions of the 102nd division were defeated by the US 186th regimental combat team. The Japanese garrison of Panay, consisting of a single company, retreated to the mountains and survived relatively intact despite efforts of US 185th regimental combat team.

On Cebu, the 102nd division had a single battalion and an assortment of people rescued from Leyte. They suffered heavy casualties during the Battle for Cebu City but was able to continue a guerilla warfare afterwards.

On Negros island, the 102nd division had about 4000 personnel from 77th infantry brigade. These survived after a guerilla campaign against invading US forces since March 1945.

See also
 List of Japanese Infantry Divisions
 Independent Mixed Brigades (Imperial Japanese Army)

Notes and references
This article incorporates material from Japanese Wikipedia page 第102師団 (日本軍), accessed 14 June 2016
 Madej, W. Victor. Japanese Armed Forces Order of Battle, 1937-1945 [2 vols] Allentown, PA: 1981

Japanese World War II divisions
Infantry divisions of Japan
Military units and formations established in 1944
Military units and formations disestablished in 1945
1944 establishments in Japan
1945 disestablishments in Japan